Looking is the act of intentionally focusing visual perception on someone or something.

Looking or The Looking may also refer to:
Looking (TV series), an American comedy-drama television series
Looking: The Movie, a comedy-drama movie related to the TV series
Looking (1981 book), a 1981 children's book about vision by Richard Allington and Kathleen Krull (illustrated by Bill Bober)
Looking (1986 book), a 1986 children's book about vision by Joy Wilt Berry
The Looking, an indie pop and Americana band led by Todd Carter

See also

Look (disambiguation)